The Idiot, is a 1959 Soviet film directed by Ivan Pyryev. It is based on Part 1 of the eponymous 1869 novel by Fyodor Dostoevsky; Yuriy Yakovlev declined to play the title character in a sequel which was never made.

Cast
Yuri Yakovlev as Prince Lev (Leo) Myshkin
Yuliya Borisova as Nastasia Philippovna Barashkova
Nikita Podgorny as Ganya Ivolgin
Vera Pashennaya as General's wife
 Sergey Martinson as Lebedev
 Leonid Parkhomenko as Parfen Rogozhin
 Ivan Lyubeznov as General Ivolgin
 Raisa Maksimova as Aglaya Yepanchina  
 Vladimir Muravyov as Ferdishchenko  
 Grigory Shpigel as Ptitsyn

References

External links

 

1958 films
Soviet drama films
1950s Russian-language films
Films based on The Idiot
Films directed by Ivan Pyryev
1958 drama films
Mosfilm films